Mukesh Madhavan (born 5 March 1957), known mononymously as Mukesh, is an Indian actor, film producer, television presenter, and politician who predominantly works in Malayalam cinema besides also having sporadically appeared in Tamil-language films. In a film career spanning four decades, he has acted in over 260 Malayalam films. His 1996 film Kaanaakkinaavu premiered at the IFFI and won the Nargis Dutt Award for Best Feature Film on National Integration. He co-produced Kadha Parayumbol (2007), which won the Kerala State Film Award for Best Film with Popular Appeal and Aesthetic Value. He also produced the 2012 film Thattathin Marayathu, which is considered one of the defining films of the Malayalam New Wave.

He made his onscreen debut in the 1982 film Balloon in a minor role. He continued to do minor roles and rose to secondary lead roles in the following years. He rose to stardom after playing the lead in the comedy thriller film Ramji Rao Speaking (1989). By the early-1990s, he established himself as a bankable leading actor after starring in several successful comedy films in the early 1990's directed by Siddique-Lal. He continued to appear in successful comedy films throughout the 1990's, establishing himself as one of the major stars of the Malayalam film industry. Towards the 2000's he switched back to supporting roles. He was the chairman of the Kerala Sangeetha Nataka Academy. Mukesh is the current MLA representing the Kollam constituency of Kerala state.

Early and personal life 
Mukesh was born to actors O. Madhavan and Vijayakumari, in Kollam, Kerala, India on 5 March 1957. He has two sisters, Sandhya Rajendran and Jayasree. Sandhya and her husband, E.A. Rajendran are also actors (stage and film). He attended Infant Jesus School, Tangasseri and pursued a bachelor's degree in science (B.Sc.) from Sree Narayana College in Kollam. He holds a second bachelor's degree in law (LLB) from Kerala Law Academy Law College, Thiruvananthapuram. He was active in stage dramas before he entered the film industry. He married South Indian film actress Saritha in 1988, and they have two sons. After a lengthy separation, they divorced in 2011. Their elder son Shravan made his acting debut in the 2018 film Kalyanam. Mukesh married dance scholar Methil Devika on 24 October 2013. The couple filed for divorce in 2021. He was elected to the Kerala Legislative Assembly from Kollam constituency in the election of 2016.

Acting career

1982–1989
Mukesh made his acting debut in 1982 with the film Balloon. Later, that same year he landed his first leading role with the drama film Ithu Njangalude Katha, a remake of the Tamil-language film Palaivana Solai. The film was an average grosser, with the film's songs becoming chartbusters. In the mid-80's, he appeared in several comedy films directed by Priyadarshan, usually in supporting roles.  His first film as solo hero came in 1985 with Mutharamkunnu P.O. Despite being an average grosser at the box office, the film has over the years attained a cult status. His first major commercial hit came with the 1985 film Boeing Boeing, directed by Priyadarshan. He appeared in a supporting role in the film to Mohanlal. This was his first collaboration with Mohanlal. They would go on to star in several films in the late 1980's, usually starring Mohanlal in the lead role. Examples include Ninnishtam Ennishtam (1986), Adiverukal (1986), Hello My Dear Wrong Number (1986) and Mazha Peyyunnu Maddalam Kottunnu (1986). He also appeared in supporting roles to Mammootty in the late-80's with successful films like Thaniyavarthanam (1987), 1921 (1988) and Sangham (1988). In 1988, he appeared as Chacko in the cult investigative thriller Oru CBI Diary Kurippu. The character of Chacko has over the years attained a cult status. He reprised his role as Chacko in the CBI series sequels in 1989, 2004, 2005 and 2022. Then, in 1989, he starred in Ramji Rao Speaking, a blockbuster that ran for 200 days in theatres and went on to become the second highest grossing film of the year. The film gave Mukesh his major break. Ramji Rao Speaking is considered by audiences and critics to be one of the best comedy films made in Malayalam cinema. The film still has a huge cult following. The film has been subject to many memes, with Mukesh's dialogue in the film "Kambilipothappu" becoming a catchphrase. He also starred alongside Mohanlal in Vandanam (1989), which is considered a cult classic in Malayalam cinema.

1990–1999
In the beginning of the 1990, he made an extended guest role in Priyadarshan's Akkare Akkare Akkare, which was the sequal to Patanapravesham (1989). After the success of Ramji Rao Speaking, he was offered many leading roles. The film Cheriya Lokavum Valiya Manushyarum was then released, which was a commercial success. Following the success of Cheriya Lokavum Valiya Manushyarum he again collaborated with Siddique-Lal for In Harihar Nagar, which is considered to be one of the defining films of the Malayalam golden age of comedy. The film was a box office success, running for 100 days in theatres. The film established Mukesh as a bankable lead actor in the industry. The film has over the years accumulated a cult following and huge fan base, with many scenes from the film being used in memes and online trolls today. Following the success of In Harihar Nagar, a series of unrelated low budget comedy films featuring the principal cast of the film were produced. These films usually starred Mukesh, Jagadeesh or Siddique in the lead roles. In 1990 he also formed a successful onscreen pairing with another rising star, Jayaram with successful films like Thoovalsparsham, Marupuram and Malayogom. He also starred as solo hero in commercially successful films like Gajakesariyogam, Ottayal Pattalam and Champion Thomas in the same year. His role as a serial womanizer in Kouthugal Vaartakal boosted his popularity as a lead actor. He also made his Tamil debut that same year in Manaivi Oru Manickam.  

He then, in 1991 starred in the classic comedy film, Godfather directed by Siddique-Lal, another blockbuster, the film ran for 417 days at Sreekumar Theatre in Trivandrum. Godfather became the longest running film in Malayalam film industry. The film established him as one of the major stars of the Malayalam film industry. He then teamed up with director P. G. Vishwambaran, who had earlier directed him in Ithu Njangalude Katha (1982), in several successful films like Innathe Programme and Irrikku M. D. Akathundu. He then starred in the 1991 cult slapstick comedy film Mookilla Rajyathu, in which he played the role of a mental patient who escaped from a mental asylum. The film is widely regarded as a classic in Malayalam cinema. He starred in the critically acclaimed Kakkathollayiram in which he played the role of the brother to mentally ill woman. He also worked with Shaji Kailas in Souhrudam (1991), in which he starred alongside Urvashi, Sai Kumar and Parvathy. However, Souhrudam was a box-office bomb. The next year, he starred alongside Jayaram in Kamal's Aayushkalam (1992), a super hit at the box office. This was the first in a set of successful collabs with director Kamal. They then teamed up for the romantic comedy Ennodishtam Koodamo, another super hit. He then starred in Makkal Maahathmiam, which was written by Siddique-Lal. He then played the role of a petty thief in Manyanmar. This was his first onscreen pairing with Sreenivasan. The following year, he starred in the Balachandra Menon directorial Ammayane Sathyam. The film was also a box office success, running for 100 days in theatres. The next year, he starred in Malappuram Haji Mahanaya Joji, another box office success. It ran for 125 days in theatres and was one of the highest grossers of the year. 

By the mid-1990's Mukesh got stuck in an image trap, usually of a young man behaving, or thought to be behaving fraudulently under pressure, such as a bribe taking policeman, a thief on the run, or someone lying to impress his parents, or to get a job. The mid-1990's also signaled the end of the golden age of comedy. In 1995, most of his films were failures at the box office, sparring a few such as Sipayi Lahala and Mannar Mathai Speaking (the sequel to Ramji Rao Speaking). The consecutive failures of his films forced him move on to supporting roles. He appeared in a supporting role to Mammootty in the 1996 comedy-drama film Hitler, directed by Siddique of the Siddique-Lal duo. Hitler became the highest-grossing Malayalam film at the time, and completed a 300-day theatrical run. It became the most viewed film in the history of Mollywood. He then starred in Sibi Malayil's 1996 film Kanakkinavu, which was screened at the Indian Panorama section of the IFFI and won the Nargis Dutt Award for Best Feature Film on National Integration. The film was also commercially successful. The next year, all of his films except for Kalyana Kacheri, bombed at the box office. The following year, he starred in Mattupetti Machan, which was one of the highest grossers of the year and ran for 100 days in theatres. It was remade in Tamil as Banda Paramasivam, in Hindi as Housefull 2. He then made a cameo appearance as himself in the highly successful Sreekrishnapurathe Nakshathrathilakkam. 1999 was a successful year for Mukesh as he starred in two super-hits namely, Friends, which was the highest grosser of the year (He starred alongside Jayaram for the first time in 7 years and Sreenivasan) and alongside Divya Unni in the Vinayan directorial Aakasha Ganga, which was the fourth highest grossing film of the year.

Later career
In the 2000s and 2010s, he struggled to escape an image trap. Regardless, he came back with interesting supporting roles in Udayananu Tharam, Goal, Vinodayathra, Boyy Friennd, Kaiyoppu, Naalu Pennungal and Katha Parayumbol. He has been a part of many of Mohanlal's comedies, most of them directed by Priyadarshan.

He also ventured into production with Sreenivasan, their first movie, Katha Parayumbol, featured a cameo by Mammootty.

Mukesh was the host of a Malayalam version of Deal or No Deal, which was aired on Surya TV.

In 2007, Mukesh authored a book based on experiences while he was a student at college, and tales from his life as a movie actor. titled Mukesh Kathakal – Jeevithathiley Nerum Narmavum. It proved very successful.

He is now acting in Badai bungalow, a comedy and celebrity talk show hosted by Ramesh Pisharody, launched on Asianet from 2013.

Awards 
 2007 : Asianet Film Award for Best Film (Producer) – Kadha Parayumbol
 2007 : Filmfare Award for Best Film – Malayalam (Producer) – Kadha Parayumbol
 2007 : Kerala State Film Award for Best Film with Popular Appeal and Aesthetic Value-Kadha Parayumbol
 2011 : ISC Award
 2013 : Kerala Film Critics Association Awards - Second Best Actor - English: An Autumn in London, Vasanthathinte Kanal Vazhikalil
 2016 : Asianet Special Awards - Multifaceted personality of the year

Filmography

Malayalam films

1980s

1990s

2000s

2010s

2020s

Tamil films

As producer
 Katha Parayumbol (2007)
 Thattathin Marayathu (2012)

Television career

Radio anchor
  Laksham Laksham Pinnale (2013) (Reality show-Super 94.7 fm)

Theater performance
 Mukesh started Kalidasa Visual Magic for play productions. His first play Chayamukhi was in 2008 with Mohanlal and was written and directed by Prasanth Narayanan. He also appeared with his sister, Sandhya Rajendan and his wife Methil in the 2015 adaptation of Naaga'', directed by Suveeran.

References

External links

 
 Mukesh at MSI

Male actors from Kollam
Indian male film actors
Living people
Male actors in Malayalam cinema
Malayalam film producers
Kerala MLAs 2016–2021
Communist Party of India (Marxist) politicians from Kerala
20th-century Indian male actors
Sree Narayana College, Kollam alumni
Indian actor-politicians
21st-century Indian male actors
Film producers from Kerala
Male actors in Malayalam theatre
Indian male stage actors
Indian male television actors
1957 births